The Belfast River is a  tidal channel in Bryan County, Georgia, in the United States. It is a northern side channel of the Laurel View River. At its seaward end where it rejoins the Laurel View, the two rivers form the Medway River, which continues to the Atlantic Ocean through St. Catherines Sound.

The river's name is derived from Belfast, the capital city of Northern Ireland.

See also
List of rivers of Georgia

References 

USGS Hydrologic Unit Map - State of Georgia (1974)

Rivers of Georgia (U.S. state)
Rivers of Bryan County, Georgia